The Three-Point Contest is a National Basketball Association (NBA) contest held on the Saturday before the annual All-Star Game as part of All-Star Weekend.

The 2019 iteration of the contest involved ten participants. From its introduction in 1986 to 2018, eight participants were selected to participate in each season's shootout. In 2002-2003 to 2012-2013 there were six participants.  Damian Lillard of the Portland Trail Blazers is the most recent winner of the event which was held at the Vivint Arena in Salt Lake City.

Rules
In this contest, participants attempt to make as many three-point field goals as possible from five positions behind the three-point line in one minute. Players begin shooting from one corner of the court, and move from station to station along the three-point arc until they reach the other corner. At each shooting station is a rack with five basketballs. Out of the five balls, four are worth one point (the standard orange Wilson game balls) and the fifth one (a red/white/blue ABA-style ball; often nicknamed the "money ball") is worth two points. The goal of this contest is to score as many points as possible within one minute. A perfect score used to be 30 points. Since the 2014 contest, a rack consisting only of "money balls" has been added, and can be placed on any of the 5 spots of the player's choice, bringing up the maximum possible score to 34 points. In the 2020 contest, two additional Mountain Dew shots were placed on each side of the top of the key, worth three points each. This increased the maximum possible score to 40, and the time limit was increased from 60 to 70 seconds.

In the qualifying round, each player has a chance to score as many points as possible. The three players with the top scores advance to the finals. The final round is played in the same way as the qualifying round, but players shoot according to the ascending order of their first-round scores. In each round, the shots and the score are confirmed by the referee and the television instant replay system. The final round will be shot in reverse direction (left to right corner for a left-handed shooter and vice versa). In the case of a tie, multiple extra rounds of 30 seconds (1 minute in the final) are played to determine the winner.

Milestones
 Larry Bird, the inaugural winner of this contest, and Craig Hodges have each won three consecutive times, while Mark Price, Jeff Hornacek, Peja Stojaković and Jason Kapono have each won two consecutive times.
 Craig Hodges holds the record for most shots made in one round (21/25), as well as most consecutive shots made (19) and most appearances (8).
 Stephen Curry (first round, 2021) holds the record with 31 points, albeit in the newer 40-point format.
 Detlef Schrempf and Michael Jordan share the record for the fewest points scored in any round with five in 1988 and 1990, respectively.
 Kyrie Irving is the youngest player to win the contest at the age of 20.
 Rimas Kurtinaitis is the only non-NBA player to participate in the contest.
 Dirk Nowitzki is the first 7-foot player to win the contest.
 Jason Kapono is the last person to ever win back to back.
 Karl-Anthony Towns is the first and only center to win the contest.

Winners

Three Point Contest champions by franchise

All-time participants

Records
Sources:

Sponsors
Sources:

Notes
  The 1999 All-Star Game was cancelled due to the 1998–99 NBA lockout.
  Denote contests that required a tiebreaking round. The final score given here came from the tiebreaker.
  Starting with the 2014 Three-Point Contest, the format includes four extra "money balls".
  Starting with the 2020 Three-Point Contest, the format includes two extra long-range shots, worth three points each.
  CJ McCollum was named as a replacement to Chris Bosh due to the latter being unable to participate in the event with a calf injury (and later on, a blood clot in his leg).
  Mike Conley was named as a replacement to Devin Booker due to the latter being unable to participate in the event with a knee injury.
  Julius Randle was named as a replacement to Anfernee Simons due to the latter being unable to participate in the event with a ankle injury.

See also

 Three-Point Contest in the Women's National Basketball Association (WNBA)

References
General
 
 
 
 
 
 

Specific

 National Basketball Association All-Star Game
 National Basketball Association lists
 Recurring sporting events established in 1986